Cheilanthes sieberi is a small fern growing in many parts of Australia, New Zealand and nearby islands. Common names include poison rock fern and mulga fern.

This fern may grow up to 25 cm tall. It is a widespread plant, seen in a variety of different habitats: it occurs in arid areas as well as sites with over 1500 mm of annual average rainfall. In desert areas it grows in shaded rocky gullies. However, near the coast, it can grow in full sun in cracks of rocks, or in thin soils.

Consumption by stock 

Excessive consumption of this fern can cause health issues for sheep and cattle .

References 

sieberi
Flora of Australia
Ferns of New Zealand
Flora of Lord Howe Island
Flora of New Caledonia
Flora of Norfolk Island